"Used to Love" is the first solo single by American R&B singer Keke Wyatt released as the lead single taken from her debut album Soul Sista (2001). The song was released through MCA Records and on August 28, 2001. The song was written and produced by Steve 'Stone' Huff. 

It served as the follow-up to Wyatt's duet with Avant, titled "My First Love" (2000). The song failed to make impact on the Billboard Hot 100, however the single peaked at number sixty five on the Hot R&B/Hip-Hop Songs chart.

Critical reception
John Bush from AllMusic described the song in a review of the album stating "Used to Love" rides a nice groove, with heavily synthesized horns and light scratching, while Wyatt vamps over the production."

Music video
The music video was released in 2001. On June 16, 2009, the music video was uploaded to Wyatt's Vevo channel.

Chart performance
The song peaked at number 65 on the Hot R&B/Hip-Hop Songs chart on August 18, 2001 and spent three weeks on the chart respectively.

Track listings and formats
US vinyl single
"Used to Love" (Main Version) – 4:12
"Used to Love" (Instrumental) – 4:12
"Used to Love" (Radio Edit) – 3:53
"Used to Love" (Acappella) – 4:46

US CD single
"Used to Love" (Radio Edit) – 3:53
"Used to Love" (Instrumental) – 4:12

Charts

References 

Keke Wyatt songs
MCA Records singles
2001 debut singles
2001 songs